A Night in Paradise (German: Eine Nacht, gelebt im Paradiese) is a 1919 German silent film directed by Eugen Burg and starring Wanda Treumann and Reinhold Schünzel.

The film's sets were designed by the art director Mathieu Oostermann.

Cast
 Wanda Treumann as Gabi Wiedberg 
 Reinhold Schünzel as Ede 
 Hans Ahrens as Friedrich, ein Diener 
 Else Bäck as Frau von Wiedberg 
 Rudolph Döll as Dieter von Warling 
 Otto Haerting as Herr von Ostburg, Gutsbesitzer 
 Wolfgang Schlegel as Walter Kießling 
 Ida Stella as Frau von Ostburg 
 Ernst Wehlau as Herr von Wiedberg, Gutsbesitzer

References

Bibliography
 Bock, Hans-Michael & Bergfelder, Tim. The Concise CineGraph. Encyclopedia of German Cinema. Berghahn Books, 2009.

External links
 

1919 films
Films of the Weimar Republic
German silent feature films
Films directed by Eugen Burg
German black-and-white films
1910s German films